The Monument to the First President of Uzbekistan is a monument in the Ok Saroy Presidential Palace in the city of Tashkent, the capital of Uzbekistan. It was opened by the president of Uzbekistan Shavkat Mirziyoyev, and family members of Islam Karimov on August 31, 2017.

References 

2017 sculptures
Buildings and structures in Tashkent
Monuments and memorials in Uzbekistan
Tourist attractions in Tashkent